Vuelta a la Independencia Nacional is a stage road bicycle race held annually in the Dominican Republic by the national federation, and it is the most important race in the country. Since 2008, the race is organized as a 2.2 event on the UCI America Tour.

In 2013, 2017 and 2020 the race was held as a national event, since it was excluded from the UCI America Tour.

Winners

References

External links

UCI America Tour races
Cycle races in the Dominican Republic
Recurring sporting events established in 1979
1979 establishments in the Dominican Republic